Bibstone is a village in Gloucestershire, England.

External links

Villages in Gloucestershire